The International Standard Bible Encyclopedia refers to two different versions of a Bible encyclopedia: a 1915 fundamentalist edition, and a 1979–1995 revised evangelical edition.

The first version was published under the general editorship of the fundamentalist James Orr (1844–1913), among other objectives to counteract the impact of higher criticism. The original encyclopedia was published by the Howard-Severance Co., Chicago, in 1915. It is in the public domain and can be found freely available at various sites.

A revised version, edited by Geoffrey W. Bromiley, was published by Wm. B. Eerdmans Publishing Co. in the years 1979 (Vol. 1, Vol. 2 appeared in 1982) to 1995 (Vols. 3 and 4). It contains articles by nearly 200 evangelical scholars about archaeological discoveries, the language and literature of Bible lands, customs, family life, occupations, and the historical and religious environments of Bible people.

Reception

Second edition
The first two volumes both won the Gold Medallion Book Award for reference books.

Writing in a 1984 book review for The Churchman, Stephen Motyer said the conservatism of the International Standard Bible Encyclopedia "is that of broad, main-line evangelicalism, although it seems to be slightly more conservative than the work it replaces". He also says it makes "dogmatic use of the Bible", and adds: "sometimes it seems to go over the top somewhat". However, he concludes "The criticisms I have made do not, to my mind, qualify the great solid worth of this production....I...seriously commend this encyclopedia..."

References

External links 
 International Standard Bible Encyclopedia (1915 revision) – (studylight.org)
 Online Version of ISBE at gospelhall.org (1915 revision)
 Eerdmans Publishing Company

1915 non-fiction books
1989 non-fiction books
Reference works in the public domain
Encyclopedias of religion
Bible dictionaries
20th-century encyclopedias